The Cathedral of Christ the Saviour is a Serbian Orthodox church located in Banja Luka, Republika Srpska, Bosnia and Herzegovina.

A Holy Trinity Church was built during interwar Yugoslavia in the center of Banja Luka. The construction of the church took from 1925 to 1929, and was solemnly consecrated on the Day of Salvation in 1939. During the German bombing on April 12, 1941, the church was hit and the altar section (apse) was significantly damaged. In May of the same year, the Ustashas declared the church a "mound of the city" and ordered the Serbs, Jews and Roma to completely demolish it, brick by brick.

During the time of the communist government in  Yugoslavia, while many buildings were rebuilt, the demolished Cathedral was not allowed to be reconstructed. During the Bosnian war, Eparchy of Banja Luka was granted permission for the destroyed church to be rebuilt, and the monument to fallen soldiers was moved to a nearby site, also owned by the church. The erection of the new church began in 1993 when the foundations were consecrated. This solemn act was performed by Serbian Patriarch Pavle with the bishops and clergy of the Serbian Orthodox Church. The church was rebuilt under the name of the Cathedral of Christ the Saviour, because, in the meantime, another church consecrated in the name of the Holy Trinity has been built in Banja Luka (1963-1969), as a memorial to the demolished one, which the Orthodox Serbs thought they would never be able construct again.

The cathedral is built of red and yellow travertine stone, originating from Mesopotamia, whose quality (excavation and processing) is certified by Prof. Dr. Bilbija, an expert from the Belgrade Institute for Material Testing. It is built with a three-layer wall: stone, reinforced concrete, brick. The domes are covered with golden stainless steel, brought from Siberia. Exterior construction work on the temple was completed on September 26, 2004, when the first liturgy was also celebrated. The liturgy was celebrated by 8 bishops with the clergy and deacons of the Diocese of Banja Luka, with the presence of tens of thousands of believers.

The present church is architecturally identical to the previous one and is the tallest religious building in Banja Luka, with a bell tower 47 meters high and a 22.5 meter dome. The Bishop's Temple was consecrated by Bishop Ephrem on Salvation Day in 2009.

On the occasion of the 20th anniversary of the founding and celebration of the Day of Republika Srpska, Patriarch Irinej celebrated the Holy Blessed Liturgy in the church on January 9, 2012.

References

Churches completed in 1929
20th-century Eastern Orthodox church buildings
Serbian Orthodox cathedrals in Bosnia and Herzegovina
Serbian Orthodox church buildings in Bosnia and Herzegovina
Churches in Banja Luka
Buildings and structures in Republika Srpska